VoteRunLead is a 501(c)(3) nonprofit organization that trains women to run for office in the United States. Founded in 2014 by Erin Vilardi with co-founders Rhonda Briggins, Shannon Garrett, Pakou Hang and Liz Johnson, it is nationally recognized as the largest, most diverse candidate training program for women. 

VoteRunLead is non-partisan and focuses on state and local offices. The organization has trained more than 33,000 women to run for office and is planning to train another 30,000 women by 2020.

History

VoteRunLead was first launched in 2004 by Marie C. Wilson and Erin Vilardi as a program of The White House Project, establishing the largest national political training program readying women for public office and training more than 15,000 women to run for office and seek out leadership opportunities in their civic life.  After The White House Project closed, VoteRunLead was founded as a standalone organization in 2014 by Erin Vilardi with Rhonda Briggins, Shannon Garrett, Pakou Hang and Liz Johnson.

In 2018, Jehmu Greene became Board Chair and Erika Alexander, Piper Perabo and Bre Pettis joined the Advisory Board. They were joined by former Republican Congresswoman Susan Molinari, co-founder of Black Voters Matter LaTosha Brown and New York City's Commissioner for International Affairs, Penny Abeywardena in 2020. 

Facebook's Crystal Patterson has served as Chair of the Board since 2019. Melinda Gates included Vilardi in her article "5 of the most interesting conversations she had in 2020." 

A photo of Representatives Ilhan Omar, Ayanna Pressley, Rashida Tlaib and Alexandria Ocasio-Cortez at VoteRunLead's Women & Power: National Town Hall went viral after Ocasio-Cortez posted it on her Instagram page. The photo, captioned "Squad", served as a reminder that the incoming 116th Congress is the "most female, most diverse ever, both racially and ideologically."

Notable alumnae

Lori Alhadeff, Broward County School Board Member and mother of Alyssa Alhadeff, killed at Marjory Stoneman Douglas High School
Congresswoman Cori Bush was elected to the U.S. House of Representatives for Missouri's 1st congressional district in 2020 
State Representative Park Cannon, elected at 24 years old, is the first openly queer woman elected to Georgia State Assembly
Councilwoman Catherine Emmannuel is the first Latina and youngest woman elected to the Eau Claire City Council
Liuba Grechen Shirley, 2018 Democratic Party nominee for Congress representing the NY-2 district
Tishaura Jones, City Treasurer of St. Louis, MO 
State Representative Brenda Lopez is first Latina elected to the Georgia State Assembly.
State Representative Ilhan Omar, the first Somali American woman to be elected to any state legislature in the country.  
Kelda Roys, 2018 Democratic candidate for Governor of Wisconsin
Lauren Underwood, 2018 Democratic Party nominee for Congress representing the IL-14 district
State Representative JoCasta Zamarripa is the first Latina and openly bisexual legislator elected to the Wisconsin State Assembly

See also
Emily's List
Center for American Women and Politics

References

External links

Erin Vilardi's talk at Personal Democracy Forum 2016 on VoteRunLead (YouTube video) 

Non-profit organizations based in the United States
Organizations established in 2011